{{safesubst:#invoke:RfD|||month = March
|day = 17
|year = 2023
|time = 17:26
|timestamp = 20230317172644

|content=
REDIRECT Ramanagara

}}